Pedro Nuno de Almeida Soares (born 10 August 1974 in Lisbon) is a Portuguese judoka.

Achievements

References

1974 births
Living people
Portuguese male judoka
Olympic judoka of Portugal
Judoka at the 1996 Summer Olympics
Judoka at the 2000 Summer Olympics
Sportspeople from Lisbon
Universiade medalists in judo
Universiade gold medalists for Portugal
Medalists at the 1999 Summer Universiade
20th-century Portuguese people
21st-century Portuguese people